Thomas Berkery (born 1953) is a Fine Gael politician from Nenagh in County Tipperary in Ireland. He is a former local councillor, and was briefly a Senator in 1997.

A farmer, auctioneer, and long-serving member of North Tipperary County Council, Berkery lost his council seat in the 1991 local elections, but was re-elected at the 1999 and 2004 local elections. He lost his seat at the 2009 local elections and stood unsuccessfully at the 2014 local elections.

References

1953 births
Living people
Fine Gael senators
Members of the 20th Seanad
Local councillors in North Tipperary
Nominated members of Seanad Éireann